Hylettus alboplagiatus is a species of longhorn beetles of the subfamily Lamiinae. It was described by White in 1855, and is known from Peru, eastern Ecuador, and northwestern Brazil.

References

Beetles described in 1855
Beetles of South America
Hylettus